Brace Yourself is an EP by Mike Paradinas, released in 1998 under his main moniker μ-Ziq.

The title of the EP is derived from the track "Brace Yourself Jason" from μ-Ziq's earlier album, Lunatic Harness. It features two remixes of the title track itself, "Brace Yourself (Remix)" and "Brace Yourself (Reprise)".

Track listing
"Brace Yourself" (Remix) (5:56)
"Kubba" (4:38)
"Vaken Bolt" (2:08)
"Losers March" (4:42)
"Summer Living" (4:03)
"Intellitag" (3:43)
"Abmoit" (4:48)
"Brace Yourself (Reprise)" (3:18)

References

Mike Paradinas albums
1998 EPs
Astralwerks EPs